Great Basin Brewing Co. is a brewery headquartered in Sparks, Nevada. It is Nevada's largest and oldest currently operating brewery—though not the state's longest operated. Great Basin beers are available as bottled draught beer at over 400 locations in Northern Nevada and the surrounding regions, including Aces Ballpark. It also serves beer at special events, such as the Best in the West Nugget Rib Cook-off and The Great Reno Balloon Race. Growlers and kegs may be purchased or filled at any of the company's tap rooms.

History
The company was established in 1993 after Nevada brewers, including company founders Tom Young and Eric McClary, successfully lobbied the Nevada Legislature to allow for brewpubs in the state. The original brewery and restaurant is on Victorian Square in Sparks. Its beers were winning national awards as soon as the next year. The Reno location was opened in 2010 with the expectation that its added capacity would satisfy demand for the next five years. Great Basin began regular bottling operations in 2011 (holiday releases had previously been available for several years, but on the scale of a few hundred bottles a year) and currently bottles three of their flagship brews.  As demand increased further, a third facility was established when Great Basin moved into the warehouse formerly occupied by the defunct Buckbean Brewery. Along with the facility, it also acquired Buckbean'''s equipment, which was modified to meet Great Basin's needs. Taps & Tanks'' opened to the public at this location in 2012, and a high speed bottling line was installed there the next year - providing capacity to bottle seasonal beers. In 2014, just one year later, Great Basin bottled its millionth beer. Great Basin saw increases in business every year during its first 20 years in operation. Taps & Tanks no longer serves the public due to new regulations on bars, but beer is still brewed and bottled there.

Beers
Great Basin brews several different beer styles and maintains ten to fourteen beers on tap. Many of its brews are seasonal or available for a limited time. Cask conditioned, barrel aged and nitrogenated beers are available by the glass on location.

Use in food
Great Basin also integrates its beers into its food menu. It reuses spent barley left over from mashing along with brewer's yeast in artisan bread. As a result of these and similar initiatives, 95% of Great Basin's waste output is reduced.

Awards and recognitions
Great Basin's brews have garnered several awards at many national and international beer competitions.

See also

 Alcohol laws of Nevada
 List of breweries in Nevada
 Barrel-aged beer
 List of defunct breweries in the United States

References

American beer brands
Beer brewing companies based in Nevada
Drinking establishments in Nevada
Buildings and structures in Reno, Nevada
Buildings and structures in Sparks, Nevada
Companies based in Sparks, Nevada
Food and drink companies established in 1993
Restaurants established in 1993
Privately held companies based in Nevada
Restaurants in Nevada
Culture of Reno, Nevada
1993 establishments in Nevada